Bogusław Pawłowski (born 8 June 1962) is a Polish biologist and professor of biological sciences at the University of Wrocław. President of European Human Behaviour and Evolution Association (EHBEA).

He was born in Prudnik. In 1996, he received his PhD in biology from the University of Wroclaw. He completed his habilitation on 22 December 2003. Pawłowski deals with the mechanisms of human evolution and the biological background of human behavior and preferences.

Works 

 Pawłowski B., Ch. Lowen, R. Dunbar (1998) – Neocortex size, social skills and mating success in male primates, Behaviour, 135 (3): 357–368.
 Pawłowski B., Dunbar R. (1999) – Impact of market value on human mate choice decisions, Proceedings of the Royal Society, London B., 266: 281–285.
 Pawłowski B. (1999) – Loss of oestrus and concealed ovulation in human evolution: the case against the sexual-selection hypothesis, Current Anthropology 40: 257–275.
 Pawłowski B. (1999) – Permanent breasts as a side effect of subcutaneous fat tissue increase in human evolution, HOMO, vol. 50/2, s. 149–162.
 Pawłowski B., Dunbar R.I.M, Lipowicz A. (2000) – Tall men have more reproductive success. Nature 403: 156. 
 Pawłowski B. (2001) – The evolution of gluteal/femoral fat deposits and balance during pregnancy in bipedal Homo, Current Anthropology, 42: 572–574.
 Pawlowski B., Kozieł S. (2002) The impact of traits offered in personal advertisements on response rates. Evolution and Human Behavior 23:139-149.
 Pawlowski B., Grabarczyk M. (2003) Center of body mass and the evolution of female body shape. American Journal of Human Biology 15:144-150.
 Pawlowski B. (2003) Variable preferences for sexual dimorphism in height as a strategy for increasing the pool of potential partners in humans. Proceedings of the Royal Society, London B., 270:709-712.
 Pawlowski B. (2004) Prevalence of menstrual pain in relation to the reproductive life history of women from the Mayan rural community. Annals of Hum. Biology, 31:1-8
 Pawłowski B. (2005) Heat loss from the head during infancy as a cost of encephalization. Current Anthropology 46(1): 136–141.
 Pawlowski B., Dunbar R.I.M (2005) Waist:Hip Ratio versus BMI as Predictors of Fitness in Women. Human Nature 16(2):164-177.
 Pawlowski B., Jasieńska G. (2005) Women's preferences for sexual dimorphism in height depend on menstrual cycle phase and expected duration of relationship. Biological Psychology 70(1):38-43.
 Sorokowski P, Pawłowski B. (2008) Adaptive preferences for leg length in a potential partner Evolution & Human Behavior, 29:86-91.
 Borkowska B. & Pawłowski B. (2011) Female voice frequency in the context of dominance and attractiveness perception. Animal Behaviour 82: 55–59.
 Żelaźniewicz A. & Pawłowski B. (2011) Female breast size attractiveness for men as a function of sociosexual orientation (restricted vs. unrestricted). Archives of Sexual Behavior, 40:1129–1135.
 Pawlowski, B., Nowak, J., Borkowska, B., Drulis-Kawa, Z. (2014) Human body morphology, prevalence of nasopharyngeal potential bacterial pathogens and immunocompetence handicap principal. American Journal of Human Biology, 26:305-310. DOI: 10.1002/ajhb.22510.
 Pawłowski, B. & Nowaczewska W. (2015) Origins of Hominini and Putative Selection Pressures Acting on the Early Hominins. W: Handbook of Paleoanthropology (eds. Henke, W. & Tattersall, I.) DOI 10.1007/978-3-642-27800-6_46-6, Springer-Verlag Berlin Heidelberg.
 Żelaźniewicz A. & Pawłowski B. (2015) Breast size and asymmetry during pregnancy in dependence of a fetus's sex. American Journal of Human Biology. 27(5): 690–696. DOI: 10.1002/ajhb.22716.
 Żelaźniewicz A., Borkowska B., Nowak J., Pawłowski B. (2016) The progesterone level, leukocyte count and disgust sensitivity across the menstrual cycle. Physiology & Behavior 161: 60–65.
 Małecki W., Pawłowski B. & Sorokowski P. (2016) Literary Fiction Influences Attitudes Toward Animal Welfare. PLoS ONE 11(12).
 Pawłowski B., Nowak J., Borkowska B, Augustyniak D., Drulis-Kawa Z. (2017) Body height and immune efficacy: testing body stature as a signal of biological quality. Proceedings of the Royal Society B-Biological Sciences. 284:20171372.

Awards 
 2016: Gold Cross of Merit
 2017: Medal of the National Education Commission

References 

1962 births
People from Prudnik
Polish biologists
Academic staff of the University of Wrocław
Wrocław University of Technology alumni
University of Wrocław alumni
Recipients of the Gold Cross of Merit (Poland)
Living people